Jesús Tirado Castro (born 9 March 1948) is a Puerto Rican sports shooter. He competed in the mixed trap event at the 1992 Summer Olympics.

References

External links
 

1948 births
Living people
Puerto Rican male sport shooters
Olympic shooters of Puerto Rico
Shooters at the 1992 Summer Olympics
Place of birth missing (living people)